Bidhannagar subdivision is an administrative subdivision of the North 24 Parganas district in the Indian state of West Bengal. After transferring Rajarhat-Gopalpur Municipality and Rajarhat (Community development block) to Bidhannagar subdivision, Bidhannagar subdivision's total area becomes 141.37 sq km (54.58 sq mi), population becomes 808,251 (2011 Census) and density becomes 5,700/sq km (15,000/sq mi).

Subdivisions
North 24 Parganas district is divided into the following administrative subdivisions:

Religion
Given below is an overview of the religion-wise break-up of the population across the subdivisions of North 24 Parganas district, as per 2011 census:

North 24 Parganas district with 24.22% Muslims (in 2001) has been identified as a minority concentrated district by the Ministry of Minority Affairs, Government of India. A baseline survey on religious minority population has been carried out under the aegis of Indian Council of Social Science Research and funded by the Ministry of Minority Affairs. For information on the survey see North 24 Parganas: minority concentrated district.

Population movement
North 24 Parganas district is densely populated, mainly because of the influx of refugees from East Pakistan (later Bangladesh). With a density of population of 2,182 per km2 in 1971, it was 3rd in terms of density per km2 in West Bengal after Kolkata and Howrah, and 20th in India. According to the District Human Development Report: North 24 Parganas, “High density is also explained partly by the rapid growth of urbanization in the district. In 1991, the percentage of urban population in the district has been 51.23.”

The census figures show the number of refugees from East Pakistan in 1971 was nearly 6 million (60 lakhs) and in 1981, the number was assessed at 8 million (80 lakhs). A district-wise break-up in 1971, shows the main thrust of the refugee influx was on 24-Parganas (22.3% of the total refugees), Nadia (20.3%), Bankura (19.1%) and Kolkata (12.9%).

The North 24 Paraganas district has a 352 km long international border with Bangladesh, out of which 160 km is land border and 192 km is riverine border. Only a small portion of the border has been fenced and it is popularly referred to as a porous border. There are reports of Bangladeshi infiltrators. The CD Block pages carry Decadal Population Growth information.

An estimate made in 2000 places the total number of illegal Bangladeshi immigrants in India at 1.5 crore, with around 3 lakh entering every year. The thumb rule for such illegal immigrants is that for each illegal person caught four get through. While many immigrants have settled in the border areas, some have moved on, even to far way places such as Mumbai and Delhi. The border is guarded by the Border Security Force. During the UPA government, Sriprakash Jaiswal, Union Minister of State for Home Affairs, had made a statement in Parliament on 14 July 2004, that there were 12 million illegal Bangladeshi infiltrators living in India, and West Bengal topped the list with 5.7 million Bangladeshis. More recently, Kiren Rijiju, Minister of State for Home Affairs in the NDA government has put the figure at around 20 million.

Administrative units
Bidhannagar subdivision consists of Bidhannagar Municipality, Mahishbathan II Gram Panchayat and Rajarhat-Gopalpur Municipality (subsequently merged to form Bidhannagar Municipal Corporation since 2015), including Nabadiganta Industrial Township (Bidhannagar Sector - V) and Rajarhat (Community development block).

Police stations
The following police stations are under Bidhannagar Police Commissionerate:

Municipal towns/ cities
An overview of the two municipal cities in Bidhanagar subdivision is given below. The data provided here is that of a period prior to the formation of Bidhannagar Municipal Corporation, and, as such, would require updating as and when such information is available.

Note 1: Bidhannagar Municipal Corporation was formed in 2015 and Rajarhat-Gopalpur Municipality has been part of it and also transferred to Bidhannagar subdivision.

Blocks
Community development block in Bidhannagar subdivision is:

 Note 1: In 2015, Rajarhat (community development block) was transferred to Bidhannagar subdivision.

Gram panchayats
The subdivision contains 6 gram panchayats under 1 community development block:
 Gram panchayats in Rajarhat CD Block1 are: Chandpur, Mahisbathan–II, Rajarhat Bishnupur–I, Jangrahatiara–II, Patharghata and Rajarhat Bishnupur–II.
 Note 1: In 2015, this CD Block was completely transferred to Bidhannagar subdivision.

Education
North 24 Parganas district had a literacy rate of 84.06% (for population of 7 years and above) as per the census of India 2011. Bangaon subdivision had a literacy rate of 80.57%, Barasat Sadar subdivision 84.90%, Barrackpur subdivision 89.09%, Bidhannagar subdivision 89.16% and Basirhat subdivision 75.67%.

Given in the table below (data in numbers) is a comprehensive picture of the education scenario in North 24 Parganas district for the year 2012-13:

Note: Primary schools include junior basic schools; middle schools, high schools and higher secondary schools include madrasahs; technical schools include junior technical schools, junior government polytechnics, industrial technical institutes, industrial training centres, nursing training institutes etc.; technical and professional colleges include engineering colleges, medical colleges, para-medical institutes, management colleges, teachers training and nursing training colleges, law colleges, art colleges, music colleges etc. Special and non-formal education centres include sishu siksha kendras, madhyamik siksha kendras, centres of Rabindra mukta vidyalaya, recognised Sanskrit tols, institutions for the blind and other handicapped persons, Anganwadi centres, reformatory schools etc.

The following institutions are located in Bidhannagar subdivision:
West Bengal National University of Juridical Sciences was established in 1999.
Government College of Engineering and Leather Technology was established as Calcutta Research Tannery in 1919 and in 1955 started offering B.Sc. (Tech.) course in Leather Technology. Subsequently, it added other engineering courses.
Bidhannagar College was established in 1984.
Techno India, a private engineering college, was established in 2001.
Derozio Memorial College1 was established at Rajarhat in 1996.
Dr. A.P.J. Abdul Kalam Government College1 was established at New Town, Kolkata in 2013.
St. Xavier's University, Kolkata1, a private Jesuit university, was established at New Town, Kolkata in January 2017.
University of Engineering & Management (UEM), Kolkata1, a private university, was established at New Town, Kolkata in 2015.
Amity University, Kolkata1, a private university, was established at New Town, Kolkata in 2015.
Aliah University1 was initially founded as Mohammedan College in 1880 and was elevated as a university in 2008. The main campus of the university is located at New Town, Kolkata.
B. P. Poddar Institute of Management & Technology1 was established at Kaikhali near Netaji Subhas Chandra Bose International Airport in 1999.
Note 1: Bidhannagar Municipal Corporation was formed in 2015 and Rajarhat-Gopalpur Municipality has been part of it and also transferred to Bidhannagar subdivision. Hence all the educational institutions in Rajarhat-Gopalpur Municipality are added hereby.

Healthcare
The table below (all data in numbers) presents an overview of the medical facilities available and patients treated in the hospitals, health centres and sub-centres in 2013 in North 24 Parganas district.

.* Excluding nursing homes.** Subdivision-wise break up for certain items not available.

Medical facilities available in Bidhannagar subdivision are as follows:

Hospitals: (Name, location, beds)
Salt Lake Subdivisional Hospital, Bidhannagar, 100 beds.

Vidyasagar Matri Sadan, Rajarhat, 20 beds1.

Jyangra CH Care Hospital, Baguiati1.

Private Medical Facilities (Name, location, details) 
Apollo Gleneagles Hospital, 58, Canal Circular Road, on EM Byepass, multi speciality hospital with 510 beds.

AMRI Hospitals, JC 16&17 Salt Lake City, multi speciality hospital with 210 beds.

Columbia Asia Hospitals, IB 193, Sector 3, near Sech Bhawan, Salt Lake City, multi speciality hospital with 100 beds.
ILS Hospital, DD 6, Salt Lake City, multi speciality hospital.

Anandalok Hospital, CL 88, Salt Lake City, multi speciality hospital.

Susrut Eye Foundation and Research Centre, HB 36/A/1, Sector III, Salt Lake City

The Calcutta Heart Clinic & Hospital Society, 1st Cross Road, HC Block, Sector III, Salt Lake City, multi speciality hospital.

Tata Medical Centre, New Town, 14 Mar (E-W), Rajarhat (oncology etc.)1.

Sight N Smile Multispeciality Eye & Dental Care Centre, Suraj Apartment, 1st Floor, Rajarhat, Mahisgote, HDFC Bank Building, Opp DLF 1, Newtown (ophthalmology, dentistry, cardiology, orthopaedics etc.)1.

Teeth Care Multispeciality Dental Clinic, B1, New Town Metro Plaza, Aatghara-Rajarhat Road, Ataghara Petrol Pump-Chinar Park More, Rajarhat1.

Health ETC., Hatiara Road, Rajarhat, Jyangra (cardiology, general medicine etc.)1.

Note 1: Bidhannagar Municipal Corporation was formed in 2015 and Rajarhat-Gopalpur Municipality has been part of it and also transferred to Bidhannagar subdivision. Hence all the hospitals in Rajarhat-Gopalpur Municipality are added hereby.

Electoral constituencies
Lok Sabha (parliamentary) and Vidhan Sabha (state assembly) constituencies in Bidhannagar subdivision were as follows:

 Note 1: In 2015, these Vidhan Sabha Constituencies were transferred to Bidhannagar subdivision.

References

Subdivisions in North 24 Parganas district